Abdulrahman Al-Bishi (born 1 July 1982) is a Saudi Arabian footballer.

With Al-Nasr
Al-Bishi joined the Al-Nassr club in 1996 through Mr. Abdulla Al-Howaishel.  After 15 days of joining, he was recalled by the Al-Nasr's Under 17 squad's trainer Yousef Khamis. At the beginning, Al-Bishi played as a midfielder; however, Khamis decided that Al-Bishi would be better suited in a forward position.

In Abdularahman's first two seasons, he scored 74 goals for Al-Nasr's under 17 team. When he was 17, Al-Bishi was called for Al-Nasr under 20 squad. He played his first match when he was just 18.

International career
Al-Bishi played with almost every Saudi Arabian team but didn't get the success he looked for due to the frequent injuries he suffered. He made three appearances for Saudi Arabia at the 2004 AFC Asian Cup finals.

He played with the Saudi schools team, under 17, under 20, under 23 and the Saudi first team.

References

External links

1982 births
Living people
Saudi Arabian footballers
Al Nassr FC players
Sdoos Club players
2004 AFC Asian Cup players
Saudi Professional League players
Saudi Second Division players
Association football forwards
Saudi Arabia international footballers